Bitchcraft may refer to:

Bitchcraft (American Horror Story), a 2013 American Horror Story: Coven episode
Bitchcraft (album), a 2014 album by Blood on the Dance Floor, or the title song
Bitchcraft (Strelnikoff EP), 1998, or the title song
"Bitchcraft", a 2014 song by Drake Bell from Ready Steady Go!